Gaocun is a township of Zhao County in southwestern Hebei province, China, located  southwest of the county seat. , it has 23 villages under its administration.

See also
List of township-level divisions of Hebei

References

Township-level divisions of Hebei